Ryszard Krystosik (1935 – 24 June 2014) was a Polish ambassador to Iraq in the years of 2004–2007.

Krystosik graduated from the Central School of Foreign Service and also studied at Princeton University. He began his career at the Ministry of Foreign Affairs in 1956 and served in Vietnam, Laos, Washington, D.C., and New York. He was the leader of the United States Interest Section at the Polish embassy in Baghdad, Iraq and in 1995 was involved in the effort to release Americans David Daliberti and Bill Barloon from Abu Ghraib prison.

In 2010, he was honoured with the Officer's Cross of the Order of Polonia Restituta.

References

External links
  Ryszard Krystosik biography
 Polish Diplomat Represents Us Interests In Baghdad

1935 births
2014 deaths
Ambassadors of Poland to Iraq

Burials at Powązki Military Cemetery
Officers of the Order of Polonia Restituta